Tahoma High School (THS) is a public high school serving grades nine through twelve, and is the only high school in the Tahoma School District. The school provides for citizens in southeast King County, and has been housed in multiple buildings, the current one being a three-story structure in Maple Valley built in 2017.

Overview

Tahoma High School is a suburban campus located near the intersection of two major state routes, Maple Valley Highway (SR 169) and Kent-Kangley Road (SR 516). It is close to Maple Valley Town Square, colloquially known as Four Corners, a major retail area of Maple Valley located at the intersection.

Tahoma High School serves the entirety of Maple Valley, Ravensdale, and Hobart, portions of Renton, Covington, and Black Diamond, and a significant area of unincorporated King County. The school is bordered by Enumclaw Senior High School to the south, Mt. Si High School to the east, Liberty High School to the north, Hazen High School to the northwest, and Kentlake High School to the west.

History

The first large public school building in the Maple Valley area to serve secondary students was the Maple Valley Grade School, which opened in 1920 and housed grades one through twelve. In 1926, the Taylor, Hobart, and Maple Valley school districts merged to create a cooperative high school district and purchased a parcel of property for the construction of a dedicated local secondary school. This school, known as TaHoMa High School, opened in 1927 and held both junior and senior high students of the area for many years.  After several remodels, this first TaHoMa High School building became Tahoma Middle School.

A new building opened in 1974 as an open concept high school, while the previous building remained as the district's junior high. The open concept design proved unsatisfactory to the faculty at the time, and temporary walls were constructed early in the school building's life. In 1999, an intensive remodel of the Tahoma Senior High School building commenced. Following voter approval of a $10 million, four-year Instructional Technology Levy in 2006, the Tahoma School District outfitted the campus with wireless internet service, Activboard digital whiteboards, and upgraded computer labs.

The building faced struggles with overcrowding throughout the 21st century as Maple Valley experienced rapid growth. The district installed 17 portable classrooms, many of which were purchased for $1 from the neighboring Kent School District. These dilapidated rooms helped to drive voters to approve a $195 million bond in 2015 to build a new high school for the community. Ground was broken in June 2015, it was completed in July 2017, and it opened for the 2017–2018 school year. The previous Senior High building was converted to Maple View Middle School, while the first district high school building was converted to Tahoma Elementary School.

Academics
The Washington State Office of Superintendent of Public Instruction reported the school's graduation rate as 91.3% for the 2016–17 school year, while the statewide graduation rate was reported as 75.0%.

The school offers a variety of tech prep, honors, Advanced Placement, and "College in the High School" courses from the University of Washington and Central Washington University, in addition to the district's school board-approved curriculum. A Running Start program is available through the nearby Green River College campus in Auburn. Tahoma High School's Outdoor Academy program, which integrates Health and Fitness, Science, and Language Arts, has received recognition statewide for its work in changing the concept of Physical Education.

Tahoma also participates in the annual We The People civics competition, led by teacher Gretchen Wulfing. The team has won the Washington state championship every year since 2013, subsequently attending competitions in Washington, D.C. and placing in the top 10 teams nationwide in 2013, 2015, 2016, 2018, 2019, and 2022.

Tahoma also houses the First Robotics Competition team, Bear Metal, who has been historically successful since its founding in 2007.

Athletics
THS has been a part of the Cascade Division of the North Puget Sound League since the 2016–17 school year. They were previously members of the South Puget Sound League.

Tahoma students participate in the following sports and athletic activities:
Fall Sports: Boys' Tennis, Cross Country, Football, Girls' Soccer, Girls' Swim and Dive, Golf, and Volleyball.
Winter Sports: Boys' Basketball, Boys' Swim, Dance, Girls' Basketball, Gymnastics, and Wrestling.
Spring Sports: Baseball, Boys' Soccer, Fast Pitch, Girls' Tennis, and Track.

Tahoma Orienteering Club, the school's orienteering team, has also seen national success.

Notable alumni
 Zan Fiskum - singer/songwriter 
 Brandi Carlile - singer/songwriter
 Omare Lowe - NFL football player
 Jens Pulver - mixed martial arts fighter
UMI - singer/songwriter

References

External links 
 Tahoma High School
  Tahoma School District #409

High schools in King County, Washington
Public high schools in Washington (state)